Valentín Villazán Castro (born 12 February 1980 in Montevideo) is a retired Uruguayan footballer who manages C.A. Liverpool de montevideo in the Uruguayan Primera División.

References

External links
 

1980 births
Living people
Uruguayan footballers
Uruguayan football managers
Association football midfielders
C.A. Rentistas players
C.A. Cerro players
Centro Atlético Fénix players
C.A. Bella Vista players
Nueva Chicago footballers
Expatriate footballers in Argentina
Expatriate footballers in Guatemala
C.A. Rentistas managers